Best Time (Chinese: 最美的時光) is a 2013 Chinese television series based on the novel The Most Beautiful Time by Tong Hua. It aired on Hunan TV from 20 November to 22 December 2013.

Synopsis 
In high school, Su Man (Janine Chang) fell in love with Song Yi (Jia Nailiang), a student with good academics and superior basketball skills. She was then admitted to Tsinghua University School of Management and have never heard about him since. Ten years later, Su Man finds out that Song Yi is back from the United States and is the new director of MG Company. She decides to join the company and applies for a clerk post faking her resume. The Chief Investment Officer Lu Licheng (Wallace Chung), who aspires to become the CEO of the company, finds out her true identity and threatens her; yet he appreciates her talent and keeps her by his side. The events took an unexpected turn when Su Man's best friend Xu Lianshuang falls for Song Yi, and Lu Licheng develops feelings for Su Man.

Cast
 Wallace Chung as Lu Licheng
 Janine Chang as Su Man
 Jia Nailiang as Song Yi
 Catherine Han as Xu Lianshuang
 Jiang Yijia as Lin Da
 Xiang Jin as Chun Ni
 Jiang Kai as Mike
 Ying Er as Xu Qiu
 Jiang Yijia as Lin Da
 Mou Xiangying as Helen
 Liu Ling as Mrs. Xu
 He Jiang as Xu Zhongjin

Soundtrack

Awards and nominations

External links

Television shows based on works by Tong Hua (writer)
Television shows set in China
2013 Chinese television series debuts
Chinese romance television series
Hunan Television dramas